Sediminibacterium goheungense is a Gram-negative, rod-shaped, strictly aerobic and motile bacterium from the genus of Sediminibacterium which has been isolated from water from a freshwater reservoir from Goheung in Korea.

References

Chitinophagia
Bacteria described in 2014